The Daniel F. Akin House is a historic house located at 19185 Akin Road in Farmington, Minnesota.

Description and history 
The Italianate two-story farmhouse was built around 1860 from locally quarried limestone, and features a hipped roof with cupola on top. It is an example of the "Country Homes" style of Andrew Jackson Downing, a pioneer in American landscape architecture.

It was added to the National Register of Historic Places on December 31, 1979.

References

Houses in Dakota County, Minnesota
Houses on the National Register of Historic Places in Minnesota
Limestone buildings in the United States
Italianate architecture in Minnesota
National Register of Historic Places in Dakota County, Minnesota